Leo (1940–1967) was one of the most influential Quarter Horse sires in the early years of the American Quarter Horse Association (or AQHA).

Life

Leo was foaled in 1940. He was a double grandson of Joe Reed P-3, as both his sire and dam were by Joe Reed P-3. He was registered with the AQHA as number 1335, a sorrel stallion bred by J. W. House of Cameron, Texas and owned by E. M. Salinas of Eagle Pass, Texas.

Racing career 
Leo raced in the early years of the American Quarter Racing Association, being rated with an A speed rating and earning a Race Register of Merit in 1944. However, his exact racing record isn't available. He raced mainly at Pawhuska, Oklahoma in the ownership of John W. Tillman. Leo set a track record at Pawhuska, running 300 yards in 16.0 seconds. He is claimed to have won 20 out of 22 match races.

Tillman told Nelson Nye that "He always had a wonderful disposition, is easily handled, was a perfect gate horse, and had the heart and ability to come from behind and outrun good horses." Tillman sold Leo to Gene Moore of Fairfax, Oklahoma, who stood him at stud for a number of years. In 1946 Leo had a trailer accident that nearly cut off both hind legs, he recovered enough to race, but never as well as before. In 1947, Leo ended up in the hands of Bud Warren( of Perry, Oklahoma), who retired him to full-time stud duties. He died in 1967.

Breeding record 
Leo was the sire of many outstanding horses, including Miss Meyers, Palleo Pete, Robin Reed, Hygro Leo, Holey Sox, Leo Tag, Leolita, Okie Leo, and Tiger Leo. He sired twenty-four horses that earned an AQHA Championship, and 211 Race Register of Merits. One of his foals, Leo Maudie, earned the highest showing and racing honor the AQHA has when he earned an AQHA Supreme Championship in 1971. He was an outstanding sire of broodmares, many of his daughters going to on produce racehorses as well as show horses.

Leo's daughter Leota W was the 1947 Co-Champion Quarter Running Two-Year-Old Filly. Leola, another daughter, was the first Quarter horse to win three futurities, winning the Oklahoma, Colorado and Wyoming Futurities. His son, Palleo Pete, was the 1954 Champion Quarter Running Stallion.

Honors 
Leo was inducted into the AQHA Hall of Fame in 1989.

Pedigree

Notes

References

 All Breed Pedigree Database Pedigree of Leo retrieved on June 22, 2007
 AQHA Hall of Fame accessed on September 1, 2017

Further reading

External links
 Leo at Foundation Horses
 Leo at Quarter Horse Directory
 Leo at Quarter Horse Legends
 Leo at Premier Publishing

1940 racehorse births
1967 racehorse deaths
American Quarter Horse racehorses
American Quarter Horse sires
AQHA Hall of Fame (horses)